El Grande was a massive Eucalyptus (Eucalyptus regnans) in Tasmania and Australia's largest tree. While it was not the tallest tree in Australia, it was considered to be the largest in terms of volume, and the world's biggest-stemmed flowering plant.

Approximately 350 years old, it was burned in April 2003, and died in December 2003, as the result of catching fire in a burn-off of the debris remaining after the  clear-felling of old-growth forest in the tree's immediate vicinity. Australian forestry officials admitted responsibility for killing the tree. Its hollow trunk acted like a furnace so that it was cooked from the inside.

The death of the tree, which had already been used as a symbol in the Wilderness Society's campaign against logging, brought national and international media attention.  The destruction of El Grande became a symbol for the destruction of Tasmanian forests. Scrutiny intensified the use of Tasmania's forests for wood chip exportation, and the processes involved.

In the later half of 2003, Forestry Tasmania decided to remove individual names from the state's giant trees, but later relented. Other giant trees in the area of El Grande which are also protected by Forestry Tasmania’s Giant Trees Policy, have since been named Centurion, which was discovered in 2008, and Triarius. Trees in the vicinity that had been named previously by the Wilderness Society include the Chapel tree and Gandalf's Staff.

See also
 List of the world's most largest tree species
 List of the tallest tree species in the world
 List of individual trees

References

Individual eucalypts
Central Highlands (Tasmania)
Tasmanian forests
2000s individual tree deaths
Individual trees in Tasmania